Bopol Mansiamina (26 July 1949 – 7 November 2021), also known as Bopol or Don Paolo, was a prolific and renowned Congolese musician (bass player, guitar player most commonly as a rhythm guitarist, vocalist, composer, and producer).  He recorded and performed extensively over four decades as a solo artist, as a member of leading African bands, and in support of many African musicians.  Bopol was best known for his work in the 1980s and early 1990s as one of the four members of the Paris-based supergroup Les Quatre Etoiles (the 4 Stars) and as a solo artist.

Career and history

Early life
Mansiamina was born 26 July 1949, in Leopoldville (now Kinshasa, Democratic Republic of the Congo) as Paul Mansiamina Mfoko (or M'Foko Mansiamina).

1969 to c.1980: Zaire, Cote d'Ivoire, Togo
From 1969 to 1978 Bopol was based in Zaire and played in a series of bands.  He joined many of the leading Congolese musicians of the past and next generations.  After that time, he moved to West Africa for a few years.

After completing secondary school, in 1969 he joined Orchestre Bamboula (led by Papa Noel and also including Madilu System; Pepe Kalle; Bozi Boziana; and Wuta Mayi, then known as Blaise Pasco, with whom Bopol would work for decades).  Orchestre Bamboula was chosen to represent Zaire in the 1969 Festival of African Music in Algeria. The band broke up, however, shortly after its return from Algiers.

After that Bopol led a revival of Orchestre Rock-a-Mambo.  He then joined Dr Nico's African Fiesta Sukisa in 1970.  In 1971 he co-founded Orchestre [or L'Orchestre or Orchestra] Continental, which included Blaise Pasco (later Wuta Mayi), and Josky. From 1973 to 1976 he joined Afrisa, led by Tabu Ley.  Another report, however, says that Bopol and Wuta Mayi joined Franco and TPOK Jazz from 1974.  In 1975, Bopol and Wuta had a joint band, or "activity," called Orchestre Mamumay, which released at least two records.  In 1976 he started the group Ya Toupas, with Ray Lema and Félix Manuaku Waku.  Ya Toupas either supported or included the singer Mpongo Love.  Bopol continued to work musically with her until her death in 1990.  For example, Bopol played rhythm guitar on her 1987 album Partager, and three of its six songs (including the title track) were written by him.

In 1978 he moved to West Africa - Lome, Togo, and Abidjan, Cote d'Ivoire - and joined Sam Mangwana's African All-Stars.  Other Congolese musicians in that band included Syran Mbenza, Ringo Moya, and many others.  The original version of that band only lasted about a year, though, then split in two, with one group (including Mangwana, Bopol, and Syran Mbenza) moving to Abidjan, and another staying in Lome.

1980s and early 1990s: Paris
In 1980, Bopol began recording as a solo artist.  What some may consider to be his first solo albums are not labelled as such: they are three of the series of eight albums released under the name Orchestre Mode Succes, Innovations (vols. 1-8).  Volumes 1, 3, and 4 in that series feature Bopol and Baba Ley Assaka.  By 1982 Bopol was living in Paris and recording solo albums.  That year he formed Les Quatre Étoiles (the Four Stars), with Wuta Mayi, Nyboma, and Syran Mbenza.  Les Quatre Etoiles played together as a band, but also served as a core group of talented musicians who often played on each other's records, and those of other artists—as is evident from Bopol's discography during the 1980s.  He recorded and performed with that band, as a solo artist, and in support of other artists through the 1980s and early 1990s.  On some of his records, the producer or a songwriter is listed as Don Paolo, another name for Bopol.

Recent years
By 1996, Bopol was living in the United States.  Georges Collinet reported on an edition of his radio program Afropop Worldwide devoted to Les Quatre Etoiles, "After more than ten years living in France, Bopol and Nyboma have now come to the US, looking for a new base, because they say that in America, business is business, while in France, people are always looking at the color of your skin."  Collinet continued, translating from his interview in French with Bopol for the program, "Bopol says, if there were good studios in Zaire I would prefer to work there, because there I have lots of inspiration -- you can see what people are doing.  We compose our songs by observing people around us.  In Europe it's very difficult; you have a different life."

Between 2000 and 2010, Bopol recorded and toured with other artists, notably Samba Mapangala's band, Virunga, and Ricardo Lemvo.

Death
Bopol died on 7 November 2021, at his home in Paris, of a stroke.

Evaluations
Bopol contributed to much of the best Congolese soukous music made during its 1980s and 90s heyday.  His best work may be that from the early 1980s.  "Manuela" is recognized among his outstanding tracks.

Much of his music is recognized as being highly danceable, although somewhat repetitive.  Some of his songs - such as "Pitie, Je Veux La Reconciliation", "Samedi Soir", "Bety Bety" - were common staples on many 1980s dance floors around the world.

On his solo recordings, he consistently surrounded himself with stellar musicians.  The guitar interplay between Bopol and his frequent collaborator, Syran Mbenza, has been described as "legendary."

Discography

Solo albums

Compilations

Featured among other artists

As a band member
 Orchestre Continental, Les Grands Succes de l'Orchestre Continental (1975, compiling singles from c. 1972)
 Tabu Ley, The Voice of Lightness, CD2, tracks 1-8 (Afrisa International tracks)
 Orchestre Mamumay, "Luila" / "Beaux parents" (1975)
 Orchestre Mamumay, "Mamy Zola" / "Mayanda" (1975)
Les Ya Toupas du Zaïre, Vol. 1 - Je Ne Bois Pas Beaucoup (1976)
 Orchestre Les Ya Tupa's [sic] (with Mpongo Love), Ndaya (1977)
 Les Ya Toupas du Zaïre, Les Ya Toupas du Zaïre (1978)
 Sam Mangwana & African All-Stars, vol. 1 (or "Matinda") (1979)
 Les Quatre Etoiles, 4 Grandes Vedettes de la Musique Africaine (1983)
 Les Quatre Etoiles, 4 Stars (or "Enfant Bamileke") (1984)
 Les Quatre Etoiles, Dance (1985)
 Les Quatre Etoiles, 6 Hits / 6 Tubes (1987)
 Les Quatre Etoiles, Zairian Stars Show in the US - Kilimanjaro Heritage Hall (1988, live)
 Les Quatre Etoiles, Four Stars (or "Kouame") (1989, live)
 Les Quatre Etoiles, Les 4 Etoiles (or "Souffrance") (1991)
 Les Quatre Etoiles, Sangonini (1993)
 Les Quatre Etoiles, Adama Coly (1995)
 Les Quatre Etoiles, Live in London (1996)

As a supporting artist
Bopol has played on certainly dozens, and probably hundreds, of other artists' records.  This lists only some of them.

 Wuta Mayi, Le Beach (1980s)
 Nyboma, Doublé Doublé'' (1982)
 Nyboma & Les Kamale Dynamiques, Dé Dé (1982)
 Nyboma Et Les Kamale Dynamiques Du Zaire, Aïcha Motema (1983)
 Mpongo Love, Safari Sound (1983)
 Mpongo Love, Partager (1987)
 Syran Mbenza with the best of Paris, Symbiose (1990 or 1991)
 Nyboma, Anicet (1994)
 Sam Mangwana, Maria Tebbo (1995)
 Mose Fan Fan & Somo Somo, Hello Hello (1995)
 Ricardo Lemvo & Makina Loca, Tata Masamba (1996)
 Madilu, L'Eau (1998)
 Ricardo Lemvo & Makina Loca, Mambo Yo Yo (1998) 
 Ricardo Lemvo, Sao Salvador (2000)	 	
 Samba Mapangala & Orchestra Virunga, Ujumbe (2001)
 Déesse Mukangi, Lettre Anonyme (2002)
 Ricardo Lemvo, Ay Valeria! (2003)
 Mose Fan Fan, Bayekeleye (2004)
 Samba Mapangala & Orchestra Virunga, Song and Dance (2006)
 Columbiafrica, Voodoo Love Inna Champeta Land (2007)
Zaïko Langa Langa, Rencontres (2007)
 Ricardo Lemvo, Isabela (2007)
 Ricardo Lemvo, Retrospectiva (2009)
 Syran Mbenza, Immortal Franco (2009)

References

External links 

 July 2017 Interview with Bopol in Bogota, Colombia, in French with English subtitles, on website of Galletas Calientes Records
 
 

1949 births
2021 deaths
People from Kinshasa
Democratic Republic of the Congo musicians
Soukous musicians
20th-century bass guitarists
21st-century bass guitarists
21st-century guitarists
Rhythm guitarists
21st-century Democratic Republic of the Congo people